Church End or Churchend is the name of several places in England.
Church End
 Church End, Bedfordshire (disambiguation), several hamlets
Church End, Aylesbury Vale, a part of Haddenham, Buckinghamshire
Church End, Pitstone, Buckinghamshire
 Church End, Cambridgeshire (disambiguation), several hamlets
Church End, Coventry, a suburb
 Church End, East Riding of Yorkshire
 Church End, Essex (disambiguation), several hamlets
Church End, Frampton on Severn, Gloucestershire
Church End, Tewkesbury, Gloucestershire
Church End, Hampshire
Church End, Hertfordshire (disambiguation), several hamlets
Church End, East Lindsey, Lincolnshire
Church End, South Holland, Lincolnshire
 Church End, Finchley, London
 Church End, Brent, London
Church End, Norfolk
Church End, Great Rollright, Oxfordshire
Church End, West Oxfordshire, a hamlet in the parish of South Leigh
Church End, Suffolk
Church End, Surrey
Church End, Ansley, Warwickshire
Church End, Shustoke, Warwickshire
 Church End, Wiltshire
Church End, Worcestershire
Churchend
Churchend, Reading, an area of Tilehurst, Reading, Berkshire
Churchend, Foulness Island, Essex
Churchend, Eastington, Gloucestershire
Churchend, South Gloucestershire